Xu Yan (born November 22, 1987) is a Chinese Sanda, kickboxer who competes in the middleweight division. A multiple time provincial and national Sanshou titlist in his home country, Xu later made the switch to Oriental rules kickboxing and gained recognition fighting internationally in promotions such as Fight Code, K-1 and Shootboxing.

Career

Early career
Xu Yan began sanshou training at an early age and rose to prominence by winning provincial titles in his native Shandong three years consecutively; he won the Shandong Province Sanshou Championships at -65 kg/143 lb in 2003 and 2004 and at -70 kg/154 lb in 2005. Staying at -70 kg/154 lb, he then won the Chinese National Sanshou club Championships in 2005 and 2006, and affirmed himself as the country's top middleweight by winning a tournament held by Heroes of Legends in January 2007. Fighting for the first time internationally, Xu was part of a team of sanshou fighters that challenged shoot boxing at Shoot Boxing 2007 Mu-So 2nd in Tokyo, Japan on May 25, 2007. He lost to Kenichi Ogata via a knee to the body knockout in the third round, the first loss of his professional career. In September 2007, he won the IFB International Sanda Tournament in Guangzhou, China, defeating Muay Thai stylist Akarn Sannaha by decision in the final. A month later on October 13, 2007, Xu beat Joey Pagliuso by unanimous decision in Shenzhen, China, using his height and reach advantage to outpoint the American.

Xu won a second Legend of Heroes tournament in December 2008 before losing a unanimous decision to Vuyisile Colossa in the same promotion in Beijing, China on January 18, 2009. Making the foray into Oriental rules kickboxing, he debuted in K-1 on March 20, 2009 at K-1 Award & MAX Korea 2009 in Seoul, South Korea where he lost to Kim Se-Ki by technical knockout after being dropped twice in the second round. On May 31, 2009, he competed in the four man middleweight tournament at The Challenger event held at The Venetian Macao in Macau. After beating Keiji Ozaki by unanimous decision in the semi-finals, he lost to Heung Pak-Wing by first-round knockout in the final.

SportAccord and King's Cup tournament
Xu Yan then rebounded with a split decision win over Baxter Humby in Las Vegas, Nevada, United States on August 30, 2009 before returning to K-1 to fight Yuichiro Nagashima in a non-tournament bout at the K-1 World MAX 2009 World Championship Tournament Final in Tokyo on October 26, 2009. Although a heavy underdog, he scored an upset win by knocking Nagashima down with a left hook inside the opening thirty seconds of the fight before finishing him with the same technique soon after. He was then set to face Lim Chi-Bin at The Khan 2 in Seoul on November 27, 2009 but Lim was replaced by Lee Su-Hwan. He lost to Lee by TKO in round two.

After beginning the year with wins over Ben Barwise and Lewis Corris, Xu was given the toughest test of his career in the form of Buakaw Por. Pramuk in a Wu Lin Feng promoted event at Henan Provincial Stadium in Zhengzhou, China on June 19, 2010. Xu was outfought and lost on points. He also received a controversial count by the referee in round two after going down from a low blow. He fought and beat another Thai in his next outing, outpointing Malaipet Sasiprapa at Legends of Heroes: Muaythai vs. Kung Fu at the Arena of Stars in Pahang, Malaysia on October 9, 2010. In his second appearance on US soil, Xu was scheduled to fight Raul Rodriguez at Wu Lin Feng: Battle of Las Vegas II on November 13, 2010 in Las Vegas but a change occurred as Rodriguez was replaced by Shane Oblonsky. He lost via unanimous decision. Three weeks later, Xu Yan was drafted into the 2010 edition of the King's Cup Muay Thai tournament as one of three replacement fighters. Going down in Bangkok, Thailand on December 5, 2010, Xu was eliminated at the quarter-finals when he lost to Alexander Vogel on points.

Fight Code tournaments
On March 12, 2011, Xu faced Sudsakorn Sor Klinmee on the Oktagon 2011 card in Milan, Italy. Round one was close but Sudsakorn asserted his dominance early on with a throw and only got better in the second. Xu faded in round three and received a somewhat controversial standing eight count before losing the decision. He put a halt to his three-fight losing streak five months later when he knocked out Adil Abbas at a Legends of Heroes event in Nanchang, China before returning to Europe to compete for the Fight Code promotion and entered into the organization's 2011 Dragons Series -70 kg/154 lb tournament at the quarter-finals stage when he took the place of Dzhabar Askerov who withdrew due to scheduling conflicts. He lost to Abdallah Mabel via split decision on October 15, 2011 in Marseille, France but it later emerged that the French sporting commission had not allowed Fight Code's complete rule set just hours before the event and so a rematch was set for Geneva, Switzerland on November 26, 2011. Three weeks before the rematch, Xu suffered a first-round KO loss to Lamsongkram Chuwattana in Changsha, China. Against Mabel, Xu Yan rallied back in round three but the Frenchman dominated the first two and took the unanimous judges' decision.

K-1 tournaments
He stopped another three-fight skid with a win over Yuya Yamamoto at Krush.16 in Tokyo on February 17, 2012. Xu got off to a good start, landing against the defensively flawed Yamamoto and took over in the second by scoring three knockdowns and earning him the TKO victory. Xu Yan outpointed Quinton Arendse on a Legends of Heroes show in his native country on April 21, 2012 before making a return to K-1 after an almost three-year absence to compete in the K-1 World MAX 2012 World Championship Tournament. At the K-1 World MAX 2012 World Championship Tournament Final 16 in Madrid, Spain on May 27, 2012, he fought Yasuhiro Kido in the tournament's opening stage. The fight got off to a rather lackluster start and had the crowd booing at one point in the first round before Xu fell victim to Kido's patented spinning backfist late in the third.

After rebounding with a high kick knockout of a Japanese opponent in Legends of Heroes in Kunshan, China two months later, Xu Yan was soundly beaten to a unanimous decision in the tournament reserve match at the K-1 World MAX 2012 World Championship Tournament Final in Athens, Greece on December 15, 2012.

WMC and Hero Legends titles
Xu Yan scored a first-round knockout over Ton Kunchat at Combat Renaissance in Hong Kong on September 17, 2013.

He defeated Mike Zambidis by unanimous decision, dropping him in rounds one and two, at Hero Legends in Jinan, China on December 3, 2014.

Hero Legends title reign
After winning the Hero Legends title, Yan fought with the organization five more times in non-title bouts. In May 2014, he fought Yoshihiro Sato to a draw. A year later, he knocked out Kraisorn Singmamor, and a month after this fight, he scored a TKO win over Yodpichai SorSaksri. In July 2015, he fought twice in the span of two weeks, he won a unanimous decision against Munguntsooj Nandin-Erdene and defeated Ryota Kojima by first round TKO. A month later, he stepped in on short notice to replace Yodsanklai Fairtex against Giorgio Petrosyan, with Hero Legends making the fight a title bout. Petrosyan won the fight by knockout, after dropping Yan by a knee in the third round.

Championships and awards

Kickboxing
The Challenger
The Challenger -70 kg/154 lb Tournament Runner-up
Hero Legends
Hero Legends World -70 kg/154 lb Championship (1 Time)
2012 Hero Legends  -70 kg/154 lb Tournament Championship
2011 Hero Legends  -70 kg/154 lb Tournament Championship
2010 Hero Legends  -70 kg/154 lb Tournament Championship
2007 Hero Legends  -70 kg/154 lb Tournament Championship
IFB International Sanda Tournament
IFB International Sanda Tournament Championship
Shandong Province Sanshou Championships
2003 Shandong Province Sanshou Championships -65 kg/143 lb Championship
2004 Shandong Province Sanshou Championships -65 kg/143 lb Championship
2005 Shandong Province Sanshou Championships -70 kg/154 lb Championship
World Muaythai Council
WMC World Super Welterweight (-70 kg/154 lb) Championship

Kickboxing record

|-
|-  bgcolor="#FFBBBB"
| 2018-04-07 || Loss || align="left" | Natta William || East of Dragon || Weifang, China || Decision (unanimous) || 3 || 3:00
|-  bgcolor="#CCFFCC"
| 2018-01-05 || Win || align="left" | Suhela || Wang zhe hui meng-MMC || Shenzhen, China || TKO || 3 ||
|-  bgcolor="#CCFFCC"
| 2017-12-31 || Win || align="left" | Hiroto || Hero Legends 2017 || Shenyang, China || Decision (unanimous) || 3 || 3:00
|-  bgcolor="#CCFFCC"
| 2017-09-09 || Win || align="left" | Kushkov Asgel || The World Boxing Championship of Wang zhe hui meng || Guangzhou, China || TKO || 2 ||
|-  bgcolor="#CCFFCC"
| 2017-04-29 || Win || align="left" | Victor H.Nunes || Hero Legends 2017 || Tai'an, China || Decision (unanimous) || 3 || 3:00
|-  bgcolor="#FFBBBB"
| 2017-01-07 || Loss || align="left" | Khambakhadov Saifullah || WBK-22 || Hangzhou, China || Decision (unanimous) || 5 || 3:00
|-  bgcolor="#CCFFCC"
| 2016-10-30 || Win || align="left" | Castro || Hero Legends-Heroic soul || Shanghai, China || TKO (low kicks) || 3 || 2:36
|-  bgcolor="#CCFFCC"
| 2016-10-02 || Win || align="left" | Duangpikard Kor Sampaothong || Hero Legends || Alxa, Inner Mongolia, China || Decision (unanimous) || 3 || 3:00
|-  bgcolor="#CCFFCC"
| 2016-09-11 || Win || align="left" | Yamashita || Hero Legends || Fuqing, Fujian, China || KO (punches) || 1 || 1:33
|-  bgcolor="#CCFFCC"
| 2016-07-09 || Win || align="left" | Cyber Balma || Hero Legends || Beijing, China || TKO (ref.stop/3 knockdowns) || 1 || 2:00
|-  bgcolor="#FFBBBB"
| 2016-04-02 || Loss ||align=left| Josh Jauncey || Glory of Heroes 1 || Shenzhen, China || KO (high kick) || 2 ||
|-  bgcolor="#CCFFCC"
| 2016-01-16 || Win || align="left" | Asami Zaurus || Hero Legends || Hainan, China || Decision (unanimous) || 3 || 3:00
|-
|-  bgcolor="#FFBBBB"
| 2015-08-28 || Loss || align="left" | Giorgio Petrosyan || Hero Legends || Dunhuang, China || KO (left knee to the body) || 3 || 1:17
|-
! style=background:white colspan=9 |
|-
|-  bgcolor="#CCFFCC"
| 2015-07-24 || Win || align="left" | Ryota Kojima || Hero Legends || Chongqing, China || KO (punches) || 1 || 1:00
|-
|-  bgcolor="#CCFFCC"
| 2015-07-10 || Win || align="left" | Munguntsooj Nandin-Erdene || Hero Legends || Chongqing, China || Decision (unanimous) || 3 || 3:00
|-
|-  bgcolor="#CCFFCC"
| 2015-06-05 || Win || align="left" | Yodpichai SorSaksri || Hero Legends || Shenzhen, China || TKO (punches) || 2 || 0:40
|-
|-  bgcolor="#CCFFCC"
| 2015-05-08 || Win || align="left" | Kraisorn Singmamor || Hero Legends || Shenzhen, China || KO (punches) || 1 || 0:40
|-
|-  bgcolor="#c5d2ea"
| 2014-05-17 || Draw || align=left| Yoshihiro Sato || Hero Legends  || Shenzhen, China || Decision || 3 || 3:00 
|-
|-  bgcolor="#CCFFCC"
| 2014-01-03 || Win || align="left" | Mike Zambidis || Hero Legends || Jinan, China || Decision (unanimous) || 3 || 3:00
|-
! style=background:white colspan=9 |
|-
|-  bgcolor="#CCFFCC"
| 2013-09-17 || Win || align="left" | Ton Kunchat || Combat Renaissance || Hong Kong || KO (high kick and punches) || 1 || 
|-
! style=background:white colspan=9 |
|-
|-  bgcolor="#FFBBBB"
| 2012-12-15 || Loss || align="left" | Abraham Roqueñi || K-1 World MAX 2012 World Championship Tournament Final, Reserve Match || Athens, Greece || Decision (unanimous) || 3 || 3:00
|-
|-  bgcolor="#CCFFCC"
| 2012-07-08 || Win || align="left" | Hareruya || Legends of Heroes || Kunshan, China || KO (high kick) || 1 || 
|-
|-  bgcolor="#FFBBBB"
| 2012-05-27 || Loss || align="left" | Yasuhiro Kido || K-1 World MAX 2012 World Championship Tournament Final 16, First Round || Madrid, Spain || KO (spinning backfist) || 3 || 2:46
|-
|-  bgcolor="#CCFFCC"
| 2012-04-21 || Win || align="left" | Quinton Arendse || Legends of Heroes || China || Decision || 3 || 3:00
|-
|-  bgcolor="#CCFFCC"
| 2012-02-17 || Win || align="left" | Yuya Yamamoto || Krush.16 || Tokyo, Japan || TKO (punches) || 2 || 1:39
|-
|-  bgcolor="#FFBBBB"
| 2011-11-26 || Loss || align="left" | Abdallah Mabel || Fight Code Rhinos Series 2011 Part 5, Quarter Finals || Geneva, Switzerland || Decision (unanimous) || 3 || 3:00
|-
|-  bgcolor="#FFBBBB"
| 2011-11-05 || Loss || align="left" | Lamsongkram Chuwattana || Legends of Heroes: Muaythai vs. King Fu || Changsha, China || TKO (knee) || 1 || 
|-
|-  bgcolor="#FFBBBB"
| 2011-10-15 || Loss || align="left" | Abdallah Mabel || Fight Code Dragon Series 2011 Part 4, Quarter Finals || Marseille, France || Decision (split) || 3 || 3:00
|-
|-  bgcolor="#CCFFCC"
| 2011-08-13 || Win || align="left" | Adil Abbas || Legends of Heroes || Nanchang, China || KO || || 
|-
|-  bgcolor="#FFBBBB"
| 2011-03-12 || Loss || align="left" | Sudsakorn Sor Klinmee || Oktagon 2011 || Milan, Italy || Decision || 3 || 3:00
|-
|-  bgcolor="#FFBBBB"
| 2010-12-05 || Loss || align="left" | Alexander Vogel || King's Cup 2010, Quarter Finals || Bangkok, Thailand || Decision || 3 || 3:00
|-
|-  bgcolor="#FFBBBB"
| 2010-11-13 || Loss || align="left" | Shane Oblonsky || Wu Lin Feng: Battle of Las Vegas II || Las Vegas, Nevada, USA || Decision (unanimous) || 3 || 3:00
|-
|-  bgcolor="#CCFFCC"
| 2010-10-09 || Win || align="left" | Malaipet Sasiprapa || Legends of Heroes: Muaythai vs. Kung Fu || Pahang, Malaysia || Decision (unanimous) || 3 || 3:00
|-
|-  bgcolor="#FFBBBB"
| 2010-09-03 || Loss || align="left" | Stračanek Gregor || SportAccord World Combat Games, Quarter Finals -71 kg || Beijing, China || Decision || 3 || 3:00
|-
|-  bgcolor="#FFBBBB"
| 2010-06-19 || Loss || align="left" | Buakaw Por. Pramuk || Wu Lin Feng || Zhengzhou, China || Decision || 3 || 3:00
|-
|-  bgcolor="#CCFFCC"
| 2010-05-11 || Win || align="left" | Luis Bio || WCK Muay Thai Show || Sichuan, China || Decision (unanimous) || 3 || 3:00
|-
|-  bgcolor="#CCFFCC"
| 2010-04-25 || Win || align="left" | Ben Barwise || Wu Lin Feng || Luoyang, China || Extension round decision || 4 || 3:00
|-
|-  bgcolor="#FFBBBB"
| 2009-11-27 || Loss || align="left" | Lee Su-Hwan || The Khan 2 || Seoul, South Korea || TKO (left cross) || 2 || 2:10
|-
|-  bgcolor="#CCFFCC"
| 2009-10-26 || Win || align="left" | Yuichiro Nagashima || K-1 World MAX 2009 World Championship Tournament Final || Yokohama, Japan || KO (left hook) || 1 || 1:04
|-
|-  bgcolor="#CCFFCC"
| 2009-08-30 || Win || align="left" | Baxter Humby || WCK Muay Thai || Las Vegas, Nevada, USA || Decision (split) || 3 || 3:00
|-
|-  bgcolor="#FFBBBB"
| 2009-05-31 || Loss || align="left" | Heung Pak-Wing || The Challenger, Final || Macau || KO (right head kick) || 1 || 0:15
|-
! style="background:white" colspan="9" |
|-
|-  bgcolor="#CCFFCC"
| 2009-05-31 || Win || align="left" | Keiji Ozaki || The Challenger, Semi Finals || Macau || Decision (unanimous) || 3 || 3:00
|-
|-  bgcolor="#FFBBBB"
| 2009-03-20 || Loss || align="left" | Kim Se-Ki || K-1 Award & MAX Korea 2009 || Seoul, South Korea || TKO (punches) || 2 || 1:30
|-
|-  bgcolor="#FFBBBB"
| 2009-01-18 || Loss || align="left" | Vuyisile Colossa || Legends of Heroes || Beijing, China || Decision (unanimous) || 5 || 3:00
|-
|-  bgcolor="#FFBBBB"
| 2008-01-12 || Loss ||align=left| Malaipet Sasiprapa || WCK: Full Rules Muaythai || Las Vegas, Nevada, USA || TKO (elbow injury) || 1 || 2:43
|-
|-  bgcolor="#CCFFCC"
| 2007-10-13 || Win || align="left" | Joey Pagliuso || Legends of Heroes || Shenzhen, China || Decision (unanimous) || 3 || 3:00
|-
|-  bgcolor="#CCFFCC"
| 2007-09-00 || Win || align="left" | Akarn Sannaha || IFB International Sanda Tournament, Final || Guangzhou, China || Decision || 3 || 3:00
|-
! style="background:white" colspan="9" |
|-
|-  bgcolor="#FFBBBB"
| 2007-05-25 || Loss || align="left" | Kenichi Ogata || Shoot Boxing 2007 Mu-So 2nd || Tokyo, Japan || KO (left knee to the body) || 3 || 0:56
|-
|-  bgcolor="#FFBBBB"
| 2007-01-27 || Loss ||align=left| Zhao Zhao || Legends of Heroes || Beijing, China || Decision (unanimous) || 3 || 3:00
|-
|-
| colspan=9 | Legend:

See also
 List of male kickboxers

References

External links
 Official K-1 profile
 Official Krush profile

Living people
1987 births
Chinese male kickboxers
Welterweight kickboxers
Middleweight kickboxers
Chinese sanshou practitioners
People from Binzhou
Sportspeople from Beijing